Vostochny is a rural locality (a settlement) in Priozyorny Selsoviet, Ust-Kalmansky District, Altai Krai, Russia. The population was 176 as of 2013. There are 2 streets.

Geography 
Vostochny is located 21 km southeast of Ust-Kalmanka (the district's administrative centre) by road. Priozyorny is the nearest rural locality.

References 

Rural localities in Ust-Kalmansky District